Mount Everest Foundation is a non-political, non-sectarian, non-governmental, non-profit making humanitarian organization. MEF/Nepal is registered in the District Administration Office of Kathmandu under the Social Organization Act of His Majesty's Government of Nepal. The main focus of the Foundation is to encourage the Nepalese people to become more dynamic, viable, effective and self-reliant towards socio-economic development and the environment.

The establishment of Mount Everest Foundation for Sustainable Development is a significant step towards achieving the goals of peace, unity, social amity, international co-operation and fraternity free from racial, ethnic linguistic or religious discrimination. The Mount Everest Foundation believes in the motto of "World is a Family."

MEF intends to directly co-operate in partnership with related agencies promoting socio-economic & sustainable development with maximum utilization of local and natural resources throughout Nepal. It is MEF policy that priority is given to those programs, which address peace and Human development from grass-root levels. The services and activities implementation of which would directly benefit a large section of the people by helping to increase the standard of living.

Each and every program or project will be developed according to the needs of the local people and demand. Every program will be surveyed in the relative field in order to develop a feasibility study before the implementation and MEF/Nepal will explain the working or implementing strategy in each program and project according to their nature.

Poverty has always been a very strong issue in Nepal. Planners to social researchers stress that poverty leads to dejected problems within a society.

In this 21st Century, poverty is one of the global burdens. Nepalese professors & experts of development have pointed out diversified factors contributing to poverty in Nepal. There is a high population growth rate, inadequate social economic infrastructure, poor delivery of services, low productivity and inefficient use of resources, corruption, lack of political commitment, lack of pro-poor programs, prevalence of fatalism among the poor, poor management of programs, lack of dedication two wards work, lack of effective research lack of monitoring mechanism etc.

Some areas or sectors like agriculture, Ecovillage and Ecotourism development play a vital role in accelerating swift economic growth and alleviating poverty. For the movement, the program has chosen Patale Village Development Committee of the Okhaldhunga District of Nepal to run different activities at the first stage. The program will be based as a model for other programs in the area.

The program focuses on:

 Health Post
 Sponsorship activities to the children of the area for Education
 Training to the local people
 Development of Pharmacy culture Concept
 Eco-village development
 Eco-Tourism development
 Training, Workshop and Seminar
 Support on vocational training in different sectors.

The MEF has promised to work for Peace, betterment of Environment and Human Development. So, The MEF has categorized its program activities in four major fields.

1. Service Oriented Activities

2. Surplus Income Generating Activities

3. Research

4. Training

1.1.    Service Oriented Activities:

 Work for Peace and Development
 Education
 Health
 Environment
 Permacultural activities in the Communities
 Concept of Eco-village Development
 Eco-Tourism
 Rural and Urban Development
 Scholarship Programs
 Cultural Reservations
 Utilization of Local Resources
 Promotion of Cultural Tourism
 Communication for awareness
 Community base activities

1.2.    Surplus Income Generating Activities:

 Resource Development Activities
 Vocational Training
 Macro Enter Partnership
 Skill Development Activities
 Small Scale Cottage Industries Development Programs
 Farming Development
 Others

Board of directors

Chairman: Murari K. Sharma (Webpage Donor)

Treasurer: Madhur K. Shrestha (Lawyer)

Executive Member: Janghu Sherpa (Climbing Sherpa)

Executive Member: Anil B.Shrestha (Builder)

Gautam L.Shrestha (Travel Trade)

Dinesh B. Shrestha (Importer).

External links
 Mount Everest Foundation
 EverestNews.com

Environment of Nepal
Non-profit organisations based in Nepal